Devil Fetus (魔胎) is a 1983 Hong Kong horror film directed by Lau Hung Chuen.

Plot
A woman buys an antique vase, which contains a demon that is unleashed to cause mayhem and take possession of people it encounters.

Cast
 Eddie Chan as Kent Cheng
 Pak-Kwong Ho as Mr. Cheng
 Hsiu-Ling Lu as Juju
 Ouyang Sha-fei as Granny Cheng
 Lau Dan

Production

The soundtrack of the film includes "La Petite Fille de la Mer" from the Vangelis album L'Apocalypse des animaux (1973). It also contain samples from Ennio Morricone's soundtrack for the John Carpenter film The Thing.

Style
John Charles, author of The Hong Kong Filmography 1977–1997 referred to the film as part of Hong Kong's "early '80s gross-out cycle" of horror films.

Release
Devil Fetus premiered on 7 September 1983 in Hong Kong. It grossed a total of HK$3,920,445. Part of the film's more gruesome moments were cut by Hong Kong censors.

Reception

Author John Charles referred to the film as "silly but amusing" and stated that the special effects in the film "are too ambitious for the budget". Arty Flores from HorrorNews.net gave the film a positive review, calling it "a whacked out hilarious, what the hell is going on, freaky cult film". Jay Seaver from eFilmCritic awarded the film a negative 2/5 stars, calling it "Hilariously dated", and criticized the film for its incomprehensible plot.

References

External links
 
 
 HK cinemagic entry

1983 films
1983 horror films
1980s supernatural horror films
1980s Cantonese-language films
Films about exorcism
Hong Kong supernatural horror films
1980s Hong Kong films